An Education index is a component of the Human Development Index published every year by the United Nations Development Programme. Alongside the Economical indicators and Life Expectancy Index, it helps measure the educational attainment. GNI (PPP) per capita and life expectancy are also used with the education index to get the HDI of each country.

Since 2010, the education index has been measured by combining average adult years of schooling with expected years of schooling for students under the age of 25, each receiving 50% weighting. Before 2010, the education index was measured by the adult literacy rate (with two-thirds weighting) and the combined primary, secondary, and tertiary gross enrollment ratio (with one-third weighting).

Education is a major component of well-being and is used in the measure of economic development and quality of life, which is a key factor determining whether a country is a developed, developing, or underdeveloped country.

Calculation
A country's education index is calculated with the following formula

, expected years of schooling, is a calculation of the number of years a student is expected to attend school, or university. In most countries, a master's degree represents the highest obtainable level of education, and obtaining one reflects 18 years of education.  This means that if every student in a country enrolled in a master's degree that country's EYS index would be 1.0.

, mean years of schooling, is a calculation of the average number of years of education a student over the age of 25 has actually received. It's based on education attainment levels of the population converted into years of schooling based on theoretical duration of each level of education attended. 15 years is the projected maximum of this indicator for 2025 and is thus used as the maximum for the index. This means that a country whose citizens all attained 15 years of education by the age of 25, would have an MYS index of 1.0.

Data
Worldwide education indexes are provided by the UNDP's Human Development Report derived from the UNESCO Institute for Statistics and other sources.

See also
 List of countries by literacy rate
 School-leaving age

References

External links 
 Human Development Report Office
 Human Development Report 2007/2008 - complete (12.0 MB)

Democracy
Human Development Index
Index numbers